Robert M. Tomlinson (born December 4, 1945) is an American politician serving as a member of the Pennsylvania State Senate, who has represented the 6th District since 1995. He was previously a member of the Pennsylvania House of Representatives for the 18th District from 1991 to 1994. He was a director of the Bensalem Township School District from 1978 to 1990.

In 2010, Tomlinson saved Lower Bucks Hospital from closure by legalizing table games in Bucks County casinos. The tax revenue generated allowed the hospital to avoid closure. In November 2019, Tomlinson received the Dee Brown Lifetime Achievement Award for his assistance to the hospital.  Tomlinson's close relationship with casino lobbyists, including sponsorship of bills authored by them has been a subject of controversy which was exposed in 2022.

References

External links

Pennsylvania State Senate - Robert M. Tomlinson
Project Vote Smart - Senator Robert M. "Tommy" Tomlinson (PA)

|-

1945 births
Living people
Republican Party Pennsylvania state senators
Republican Party members of the Pennsylvania House of Representatives
People from Bucks County, Pennsylvania
American Presbyterians
West Chester University alumni
American funeral directors
20th-century American politicians
21st-century American politicians